Afroeurydemus bipunctatus is a species of leaf beetle of Ghana, Ivory Coast, the Republic of the Congo and the Democratic Republic of the Congo. It was first described by Julius Weise in 1883.

References 

Eumolpinae
Beetles of Africa
Insects of West Africa
Insects of the Republic of the Congo
Beetles of the Democratic Republic of the Congo
Beetles described in 1883
Taxa named by Julius Weise